The 1989–90 Liga Alef season saw Maccabi Acre and Hapoel Ashdod promoted to Liga Artzit as the respective winners of the north and south division. They were joined by Ironi Ashdod who won the promotion/relegation play-offs.

Hapoel Bnei Nazareth, Beitar Haifa, Hapoel Or Yehuda and Hapoel Dimona were all relegated to Liga Bet.

North Division

The division's top scorer was Hisham Zuabi of Hapoel Daliyat al-Karmel with 15 goals.

South Division

The division's top scorer was Naor Galili of Ironi Ashdod with 15 goals.

Promotion/relegation play-offs
The two second-placed clubs (Hapoel Daliyat al-Karmel and Ironi Ashdod) played off to face the 14th-placed club from Liga Artzit (Maccabi Tamra). Ironi Ashdod won both matches and were promoted, whilst Tamra were relegated to Liga Alef.

First round

Second round

References
Israel 1989/90 RSSSF

Liga Alef seasons
Israel
3